The White Pearl was a 1915 American silent adventure / romantic drama film directed by Edwin S. Porter and Hugh Ford. Produced by the Famous Players Film Company, the film starred Marie Doro in her second leading role.

Cast
 Marie Doro as Nancy Marvell
 Thomas Holding as Bob Alden
 Walter Craven as Robert Alden, Sr.
 Robert Broderick as Capt. Marvell
 Cesare Gravina as Setsu
 Maud Granger as Setsu's Wife
 Robert Cain as Capt. Featherstone

Preservation status
The White Pearl is now considered lost.

References

External links

Still during the production
Preserved still of a scene on board a ship
  Preserved rare lobby poster

1915 films
1910s adventure drama films
1915 romantic drama films
American adventure drama films
American romantic drama films
American silent feature films
American black-and-white films
Lost American films
Paramount Pictures films
Films directed by Edwin S. Porter
Films directed by Hugh Ford
1910s American films
Silent romantic drama films
Silent adventure films
Silent American drama films